Olga Imerslund (9 April 1907 – 23 August 1987) was a renowned Norwegian paediatrician, best known for her contribution to identification and naming of the Imerslund-Gräsbeck syndrome. 

Discovered simultaneously by Ralph Gräsbeck, Imerslund–Gräsbeck syndrome is a very rare genetic disease; a form of vitamin B12 deficiency causing anaemia. The malabsorption of vitamin B12 characteristic of the disease is due to genetic malfunction of the Cubam receptor located in the terminal ileum. 

Imerslund was born at Vang in  Hedmark, Norway.  She studied medicine at the University of Oslo (1936).

During her career, Imerslund was associated with a number of hospitals including Rikshospitalet at the  University of Oslo .

References

1907 births
1987 deaths
People from Hamar
University of Oslo alumni
Oslo University Hospital people
Norwegian pediatricians
Norwegian women physicians